Jean-Baptiste François Desmarets (Paris, 1682 – 1762), marquis of Maillebois, was a Marshal of France.

He was the son of Nicolas Desmarets, marquis of Maillebois (marquis de Maillebois, in French) (1648–1721) Controller-General of Finances during the reign of Louis XIV of France and nephew of Jean-Baptiste Colbert.

He learned the art of war from Claude Louis Hector de Villars. He distinguished himself during the Siege of Lille (1708), and commanded a division in Italy during the War of Polish Succession. He conquered Corsica in less than three weeks (1739), and received the rank of Marshal in 1741.

During the War of the Austrian Succession he was sent again to fight the Austrians in Italy and won the Battle of Bassignano in 1745. The next year though, he was decisively beaten by superior forces in the Battle of Piacenza, after which he had to abandon the Duchy of Milan.

After the war, he was made governor of the Alsace (1748).

References

1682 births
1762 deaths
Maillebois
French marquesses
Marshals of France
Military personnel from Paris